York Outer is a constituency represented in the House of Commons of the Parliament of the United Kingdom since 2010 by Julian Sturdy, a Conservative.

Constituency profile
The constituency is in the form of a ring surrounding the York Central constituency, and thus includes the outer areas of York itself and the surrounding rural areas. The Army's Queen Elizabeth Barracks, Strensall, and the former RAF Elvington and RAF Rufforth lie in the constituency, as does the University of York. Residents' health and wealth are around average for the UK.

Boundaries

York Outer is formed from electoral wards from entirely within the city of York.

Bishopthorpe
Copmanthorpe
Dringhouses and Woodthorpe
Fulford and Heslington
Haxby and Wigginton
Heworth Without
Hull Road (part)
Huntington and New Earswick
Rural West York
Osbaldwick and Derwent
Rawcliffe and Clifton Without
Strensall
Wheldrake

The name of the seat was subject to much discussion at the commission's public meetings, but no suitable alternative on which there was overall agreement could be found. Suggested alternatives such as "Greater York" or "County of York" were rejected as not reflecting the existence of the single Unitary Authority of York.

Members of Parliament

Elections

Elections in the 2010s

See also
List of parliamentary constituencies in North Yorkshire

Notes

References

External links
UK Parliament map of York Outer constituency boundaries

Politics of York
Parliamentary constituencies in Yorkshire and the Humber
Constituencies of the Parliament of the United Kingdom established in 2010